Tetrapterys styloptera (syn. Tetrapterys methystica and Tetrapteris methystica) is a psychoactive plant native to the New World tropics, from Panama to the Amazon rainforest. Despite limited analytic information, its alkaloids are believed to be similar to ones from Banisteriopsis caapi which contains harmala alkaloids and MAOIs. More recently, the vine has been exported from Peru as "grey ayahuasca".

Legality
Tetrapterys methystica is cited in Louisiana State Act 159.

References

Malpighiaceae
Flora of Brazil
Flora of the Amazon